Anandrivola is a rural commune in Madagascar. It belongs to the district of Maroantsetra, which is a part of Analanjirofo Region. The population of the commune was estimated to be approximately 8,495 in 2018.

Only primary schooling is available. The majority 95% of the population of the commune are farmers.  The most important crops are rice and vanilla; also cloves are an important agricultural product. Services provide employment for 5% of the population.>

The commune is situated at the Anandrivola river and on the Route nationale 5 at 339 km from Toamasina.

References and notes 

Populated places in Analanjirofo